Tara Hinchliffe (born 25 May 1998) is an Australian netball player in the Suncorp Super Netball league, playing for the Queensland Firebirds.

Hinchliffe was signed by the Firebirds in June 2017, having previously been captain and MVP of the Queensland under 19 side at that year's Australian National Netball Championships. She was also selected in the Australian side to compete at the World Youth Cup, making her a significant acquisition for the Firebirds. Hinchliffe grew up a passionate supporter of the Firebirds, idolising fellow players Laura Geitz and Gabi Simpson. She made her debut as a senior contracted player in the first round of the 2018 season. Later that year she represented Australia in the Fast5 World Series, winning a bronze medal with the team.

In January 2023, Hinchliffe made her international netball debut for Australia in the 2023 Netball Quad Series match against South Africa.

References

External links
 Queensland Firebirds profile
 Suncorp Super Netball profile
 Netball Draft Central profile

1998 births
Australian netball players
Queensland Firebirds players
Living people
Suncorp Super Netball players
Netball players from Queensland
Queensland Fusion players
Australian Netball League players
Australia international Fast5 players
Queensland state netball league players
Australia international netball players